The 1998–99 Liga Femenina de Baloncesto was the 36th edition of Spain's premier championship for women's basketball clubs. It marked the competition's expansion from 12 to 14 teams. Celta de Vigo defeated CB Halcón Avenida in the play-offs' final to win its fourth title 17 years later. CD Ensino and CB Sandra Islas Canarias were the regular stage's champion and runner-up respectively, also qualifying for the championship play-offs. On the other hand, CB Navarra and Canal Isabel II CD were relegated as the two bottom teams.

Teams by autonomous community

Regular season

Play-offs

Semifinals

Final

References

Liga Femenina de Baloncesto seasons
Femenina
Spain